Tab is a given name.

As a name for females, it may be a shortening of Tabitha.

Males known as "Tab" include:
Tab Baker (1959–2010), American actor
Tab Baldwin (born 1958), American-New Zealand basketball coach
Tab Benoit (born 1967), American guitarist and singer
Tab Hunter (1931–2018), American actor and musician
Tab Murphy, American screenwriter
Tab Perry (born 1982), former American football wide receiver
Tab Ramos (born 1966), American soccer player
Tab Smith (1909–1971), American swing and rhythm and blues alto saxophonist
Tab Thacker (1962–2007), former NCAA wrestler and actor
Tab Townsell, executive director of Metroplan

See also 

Tab (disambiguation)